Alpine skiing at the 1992 Winter Paralympics consisted of 48 events, 30 for men and 18 for women.

Medal table

Medal summary 
The competition events were:
Downhill: men - women
Super-G: men - women
Giant slalom: men - women
Slalom: men - women

Each event had separate standing, sitting, or visually impaired classifications:

LW2 - standing: single leg amputation above the knee
LW 3 - standing: double leg amputation below the knee, mild cerebral palsy, or equivalent impairment
LW4 - standing: single leg amputation below the knee
LW5/7 - standing: double arm amputation
LW6/8 - standing: single arm amputation
LW9 - standing: amputation or equivalent impairment of one arm and one leg
LW 10 - sitting: paraplegia with no or some upper abdominal function and no functional sitting balance
LW 11 - sitting: paraplegia with fair functional sitting balance
B1 - visually impaired: no functional vision
B2 - visually impaired: up to ca 3-5% functional vision
B3 - visually impaired: under 10% functional vision

Men's events

Women's events

See also
Alpine skiing at the 1992 Winter Olympics

References 

 

 

 Winter Sport Classification, Canadian Paralympic Committee

 
1992 Winter Paralympics events
1992
Paralympics